Folgore was the name of at least three ships of the Italian Navy and may refer to:

 , a  launched in 1886 and broken up in 1900.
 , a  launched in 1931 and sunk in 1942.
 , a patrol boat launched in 1954 and retired in 1976.

Italian Navy ship names